Liangshitang Subdistrict ( is a subdistrict in Shaodong, Hunan, China.

Administrative division
As of 2017, the subdistrict is divided into nineteen villages and five communities:

Wenhualu Community 
Hepingjie Community 
Chengnan Community 
Gangnanlu Community 
shenglijie Community 
Yingshan 
Gaotian 
Datang 
Gulin 
Qinglan 
Luanxing 
Lianyun 
Dalian 
Shiqiantou 
Xinshang 
Xinxing 
Xinglong 
Yunshan 
Shuanghe 
Hexing 
Yongxingqiao 
Minwang 
Xinwu 
Jiujiang

References

Divisions of Shaodong